Wisdom of Our Fathers: Lessons and Letters from Daughters and Sons is a book written by Tim Russert. On July 2, 2006 it was listed at #1 on The New York Times Non-Fiction Best Seller list.

References

2006 non-fiction books
Books about parenting